Roger Borsa (1060/1061 – 22 February 1111) was the Norman Duke of Apulia and Calabria and effective ruler of southern Italy from 1085 until his death.

Life
Roger was the son of Robert Guiscard  and Sikelgaita, a Lombard noblewoman. His ambitious mother arranged for Roger to succeed his father in place of Robert Guiscard's eldest son by another wife, Bohemund of Taranto. His nickname, Borsa, which means "purse", came from "his early-ingrained habit of counting and recounting his money."

In 1073, Sikelgaita had Roger proclaimed heir after Guiscard fell ill at Trani. Roger's cousin Abelard was the only baron to dissent from the election of Roger, claiming that he was the rightful heir to the duchy. Roger accompanied his father on a campaign to Greece in 1084. He was still in Greece when his father died on 17 July 1085 in Kefalonia. While Bohemond was supposed to inherit the Greek possessions and Roger the Italian ones, it was Bohemund who was in Italy (Salerno) and Roger in Greece (Bundicia) at the time of the Guiscard's passing.

Roger rejoined his mother on Cephalonia, his absence causing panic and confusion with his army, according to Goffredo Malaterra. The two quickly returned to the peninsula and with the support of Roger I of Sicily, his uncle, was recognised as duke in September. His Lombard heritage also made him a more attractive candidate than his Norman half-brother, who had fled to Capua. With the support of Jordan I of Capua, Bohemund rebelled against his brother and took Oria, Otranto, and Taranto. Roger, however, made peace in March 1086 and the brothers acted as effective co-rulers. In late Summer 1087, Bohemond renewed the war with the support of some of his brother's vassals. He surprised and defeated Roger at Fragneto and retook Taranto. Though described as a powerful warrior (he took the cities of Benevento, Canosa, Capua, and Lucera by siege), Roger Borsa was never able to check Bohemund's power or bring him under his control. The war was finally resolved by the mediation of Pope Urban II and the award of Taranto and other possessions to Bohemund. Roger also granted him the vassalage of Geoffrey of Conversano, thus giving Bohemond control over Brindisi, as well as Cosenza and other holdings he desired allodially. In 1089 Roger Borsa was officially invested with the duchy of Apulia by Pope Urban II.

Roger permitted the minting of baronial coinage in at least two instances (Fulco of Basacers and Manso vicedux). He planned to urbanise the Mezzogiorno by granting charters to various towns and encouraging urban planning. In 1090, he and Urban encouraged Bruno of Cologne, founder of the Carthusian Order to accept election to the archbishopric of Reggio di Calabria.

In May 1098, at the request of his first cousin once removed, Prince Richard II of Capua, Borsa and his uncle Count Roger I of Sicily began the siege of Capua, from which the prince had long ago been exiled as a minor. In exchange for his assistance, the duke received the homage of Richard, though he seems to have made no use of it, for Richard's successors paid no heed to Roger Borsa's overlordship. Capua fell after forty days of notable besieging, for Pope Urban II had come to meet Roger of Sicily and Archbishop Anselm of Canterbury had come to meet the pope.

In October 1104, Roger besieged William, Count of Monte Sant'Angelo, who was at that time independent and pledged to the Byzantines, and expelled him from the Gargano, abolishing the county. He died 22 February 1111 and was buried in the cathedral of Salerno.

Marriage and children
In 1092, Roger Borsa married Adela, the daughter of Robert I, Count of Flanders, and widow of Canute IV of Denmark. They had: 
Louis, who died young in August 1094
William
Guiscard, who died young in August 1108.

By a mistress, Roger had at least one other son, William of Gesualdo.

References

Sources

Further reading
Norwich, John Julius. The Normans in the South 1016-1130. Longmans: London, 1967.
Norwich, John Julius. The Kingdom in the Sun 1130-1194. Longman: London, 1970.
Matthew, Donald. The Norman Kingdom of Sicily. Cambridge University Press: 1992.

1060s births
1111 deaths
Italo-Normans
Norman warriors
Lombard warriors
11th-century Lombard people
12th-century Lombard people
Dukes of Apulia
Burials at Salerno Cathedral
Roger